Ashigara may refer to:

Ashigara Pass in Kanagawa Prefecture, Japan
Mount Ashigara in Kanagawa Prefecture, Japan
Ashigara Station (Kanagawa), a railway station in Odawara, Kanagawa, Japan
Ashigara Station (Shizuoka), a railway station in Oyama, Shizuoka, Japan
Japanese cruiser Ashigara, a cruiser of the Imperial Japanese Navy, named after the mountain
JS Ashigara (DDG-178), an Atago class destroyer of the Japan Maritime Self-Defense Force